Paris Saint-Germain Féminine are a French professional football club based in Paris. Founded in 1971, they compete in the Division 1 Féminine, the top division of French football. Since their inception, PSG have played 50 seasons, all of them within the top three levels of the French football league system: Division 1, Division 2 and Ligue de Paris.

PSG began life in the Ligue de Paris in 1971–72, playing regional league football during eight seasons. They were promoted to Division 1 for the first time ahead of the 1979–80 campaign and have now played 30 seasons in the top flight. PSG have been relegated to Division 2 three times, playing a total of twelve seasons in the second tier. They returned to Division 1 in 2001–02 and have never looked back since. The club's worst D1 finish to date is 12th, its placing at the end of the 1994–95 season.

The Parisians experienced their best season to date in 2020–21, when they clinched their maiden Division 1 title with 62 points (club record). Other notable campaigns include 2009–10, 2017–18 and 2021–22, in which they won the Coupe de France. PSG also fared well in 2014–15 and 2016–17, reaching the UEFA Women's Champions League final in both seasons (2015 and 2017). The 2016–17 campaign also saw the club play 37 matches and score 116 goals in all competitions (club records). Finally, Marie-Antoinette Katoto set the club's record for most goals scored in a season by a single player in 2018–19 (30 goals).

Background

Paris Saint-Germain were formed in the summer of 1971 following the green light given by the French Football Federation (FFF) to women's football. The club signed 33 women for the 1971–72 season and the newly formed team began life in the Ligue de Paris, the bottom of the French football pyramid.

PSG joined the elite during the 1979–1980 season, when the Division 1 was expanded from 20 to 48 teams. The club bounced between the top flight and the Division 2 divisions throughout the next 19 years. The Parisians finally settled in D1 after winning the D2 title in 2001. Since then, they have never been relegated from Division 1. PSG won the Division 1 crown for the first time in 2021 after finishing second in the league on eight occasions.

Seasons

As of the end of the 2021–22 Division 1 Féminine.

Missing data from matches of the Ligue de Paris (1971–1979) and National 1B / Division 2 (1993–94, 1996–97 and 1997–98 seasons).

Notes

References

External links

Official websites
PSG.FR - Site officiel du Paris Saint-Germain
Paris Saint-Germain (Women) - UEFA.com

 
Paris Saint-Germain Féminines
Paris Saint-Germain
Paris Saint-Germain Féminine seasons